Peter T. Brown was the executive director of the Free Software Foundation (FSF) from 2005 until early 2011. Having come from a business management and finance background, he began working for the organization in 2001 as a comptroller, and was promoted to executive director in 2005 after the departure of Bradley Kuhn. He was replaced by John Sullivan. He has since joined the Software Freedom Conservancy as a director and treasurer. He is from Oxford, England, and has worked in the past for the BBC and the New Internationalist.

He became an American citizen in August 2017.

References

External links 
 A video which includes Peter T. Brown is available on Wikimedia Commons.

Year of birth missing (living people)
Living people
English businesspeople
GNU people